The 1943 Oklahoma A&M Cowboys football team represented Oklahoma A&M College in the 1941 college football season. This was the 43rd year of football at A&M and the fifth under Jim Lookabaugh. The Cowboys played their home games at Lewis Field in Stillwater, Oklahoma. They finished the season 3–4, and 0–1 in the Missouri Valley Conference.

Schedule

References

Oklahoma AandM
Oklahoma State Cowboys football seasons
Oklahoma AM